Gods of Metal is a 1982 American short documentary film produced by Robert Richter for the Maryknoll Fathers and Brothers on nuclear disarmament. It was nominated for an Academy Award for Best Documentary Short.

References

External links
Gods of Metal at Richter Productions

1982 films
1982 short films
1982 documentary films
American short documentary films
1980s short documentary films
1980s English-language films
1980s American films